Einsjäger und Siebenjäger is the fifth album by Popol Vuh. It was originally released in 1974 on Kosmische Musik. In 2004 SPV re-released the album with two bonus tracks. "Wo bist Du?" was originally released on Popol Vuh's album Die Nacht der Seele as "Wo bist Du, der Du überwunden hast?".

The album's title is a German translation of the names of two characters in the Popol Vuh, Hun-Hunahpu and Vucub-Hunahpu ("One-Hunter" and "Seven-Hunter").

Track listing 
All tracks composed by Florian Fricke except 1, 3 composed by Daniel Fichelscher.  Lyrics by Salomo, revised by Florian Fricke.

 "Kleiner Krieger" – 1:04
 "King Minos" – 4:24
 "Morgengruß" – 2:59
 "Würfelspiel" – 3:08
 "Gutes Land" – 5:13
 "Einsjäger und Siebenjäger" – 19:23

2004 bonus tracks
"King Minos II" – 1:55 
"Wo bist Du?" – 5:42

Personnel 
Florian Fricke – piano, spinett
Daniel Fichelscher – electric guitar, 12-string guitar, percussion
Djong Yun – vocals

Guest musicians
Olaf Kübler – flute (on 4)

Credits 
Recorded at Bavaria Studios, Munich, May 1974 
Engineered by H. Meier 
Mixed & produced by Popol Vuh for Cosmic Couriers

Cover design by Peter Geitner 
Photography by Bettina Fricke

References

External links 

https://web.archive.org/web/20081029050641/http://www.furious.com/perfect/populvuh.html (Comprehensive article & review of every album)
https://web.archive.org/web/20080119184752/http://www.enricobassi.it/popvuhdiscografia70.htm (featuring the original credits)
http://www.venco.com.pl/~acrux/einsjag.htm

Popol Vuh (band) albums
1974 albums
Space rock albums